Black Is the Color is an album by the American saxophonist Joe Henderson, released in 1972 on Milestone. The original idea for the album was "to approach it entirely from the standpoint of having no pre-conceived ideas (i.e., melodies, themes, bar lines, etc.) for the musicians to relate to." However, after listening to a tape copy of one segment of the original session, the saxophonist "became aware of further possibilities. Making full use of 16-track tape, we could add to and improve upon what had already been recorded by multiple overdubbing of new parts, by myself and others, that would become permanent additions to the track." The players include keyboardist George Cables, bassists Dave Holland and Ron Carter, drummer Jack DeJohnette and percussionist Airto.

Track listing
All pieces by Joe Henderson.

"Terra Firma" - 12:12
"Vis-a-Vis" - 6:49
"Foregone Conclusion" - 4:57
"Black Is the Color (Of My True Love's Mind)" - 7:03
"Current Events" - 5:36

Personnel
Joe Henderson - tenor sax, soprano (3, 4), percussion (1, 3), flute (1, 4), alto flute (1, 3, 4)
George Cables - piano (4), electric piano (1-3, 5)
David Horowitz - synthesizer (1, 3, 5)
Georg Wadenius  - guitar (1, 2, 4, 5)
Dave Holland - bass
Ron Carter - electric bass (1, 5)
Jack DeJohnette - electric piano (4), drums
Airto Moreira  - congas (3), percussion (3, 4)
Ralph MacDonald - congas (1), percussion (1, 4)

References

Milestone Records albums
Joe Henderson albums
Jazz-funk albums
1972 albums